Parkdale is a mainly residential subdivision in the suburb of Birchville in Upper Hutt, New Zealand. It is located north of the Upper Hutt city centre on the northern side of Emerald Hill nestled between Birchville, Te Mārua, Timberlea and Brown Owl.

Although the developers originally pitched this housing development as a new suburb, this has not been accepted by the Upper Hutt City Council, which considers the subdivision to be part of the suburb of Birchville. Also, from as early as 1982, the New Zealand Geographic Board also clarified that Birchville, rather than Parkdale was the official locality name. Local residents rarely refer to it as a suburb of its own.

The major through street is Gemstone Drive, which runs roughly west–east from Akatarawa Road to the end of the subdivision at Topaz Street, which then connects with State Highway 2. Most other streets in the subdivision are cul-de-sacs and are named, alphabetically from Akatarawa Road, after gemstones (e.g. Amber Grove, Moonstone Grove).

This subdivision has a reputation for being a down-market suburb, because a number of own-your-own or cross-leased units erected early in the development (although this trend did not continue as the development progressed).

There is a Jehovah's Witnesses church at the eastern end of the subdivision.

Notes

Suburbs of Upper Hutt